Warren Keith is an American character actor who has been featured in many contemporary films and has an active career on stage in San Francisco in the late 1990s and since 2000. He is also a director.

Among other films, Keith has acted in four films by the Coen brothers; he played an FBI Agent in Raising Arizona and the fastidious funeral director in The Big Lebowski. In Fargo and A Serious Man he does not appear on screen but is heard several times in telephone conversation with the respective lead characters. He had a starring role in the film Haiku Tunnel. He also has appeared in television shows such as Nash Bridges, The Enforcer, and Trauma.

He is married to Melissa Smith and resides in San Francisco. Keith is a graduate of Wesleyan University and the Yale School of Drama.

References

External links
 

Wesleyan University alumni
Yale School of Drama alumni
American male film actors
American male stage actors
Year of birth missing (living people)
Living people